Jörg Eberle (born February 9, 1962) is a Swiss former professional ice hockey player. He competed with the Switzerland men's national ice hockey team at both the 1988 and 1992 Winter Olympic Games, as well as the 1992 and 1993 Men's World Ice Hockey Championships.

Career statistics

External links

1962 births
Living people
EV Zug players
HC Davos players
HC Lugano players
Ice hockey players at the 1988 Winter Olympics
Ice hockey players at the 1992 Winter Olympics
EHC Kloten players
Olympic ice hockey players of Switzerland
Sportspeople from St. Gallen (city)
SC Herisau players
Swiss ice hockey right wingers